Nikita Kostomarov (born 29 June 1999) is a Belarusian footballer who plays for Vitebsk.

References

External links

1999 births
Living people
Sportspeople from Vitebsk
Belarusian footballers
Association football defenders
FC Vitebsk players
FC Naftan Novopolotsk players
FC Orsha players